Zarbofoot (also Romanized as "Zarb-o-Foot" or "Zarb-o-Fūt") is an Iranian musical band who has been active since 2017.

Professional activity 
Zarbofoot was formed by Dariush Salehpour and Amir Mohammadi in the spring of 2017, and was joined later by the other members including Reza Tajbakhsh.
The band comprises a spectrum of wind instruments and electronic music with a touch of jazz and impromptu performance. The themes of the band's music are mostly worldwide and social.
Zarbofoot gave its debut concert on 1 December 2018 at Niavaran Cultural House on the occasion of World AIDS Day with the collaboration of the United Nations and UNAIDS in Iran, which was an electrojazz performance.

Band's name 
The name "Zarbofoot" (zarb + -o- + foot) is in fact an exaggerated Persian equivalent for the English words "saxophone" and "beat".

Members 
Zarbofoot has five main players:
 Dariush Salehpur (b. 1980), electronic instruments
 Reza Tajbakhsh (b. 1981), piano
 Alireza Miragha (b. 1979), trumpet
 Soroush Omoumi (b. 1988), flute and percussion
 Amir Mohammadi (b. 1986), saxophone and clarinet

Collaborations 
The band have collaborated with some famous singers, among them: Salar Aghili, Mohsen Yeganeh, Homayoun Shajarian, Farzad Farzin, and Benyamin Bahadori.

Works 

 Plastic Garden (Album), released 14 November 2019
 "Walking in the Rain", electrojazz, 2017
 "Plastic garden", electrojazz, 2018

The album and both songs' composer, arranger, and mixer is Dariush Salehpour.

See also 
 Dariush Salehpour

References and footnotes

External links 
 
 
 
 www.bia2.com Zarbofoot (Persian)
 www.bia2.com Plastic Garden by Zarbofoot (Persian)

1978 births
Living people
Iranian songwriters
Iranian composers
Persian musicians
People from Rasht